Fazzini is a surname. Notable people with the surname include:

Enrico Fazzini, American neurologist and osteopathic physician
Luca Fazzini (born 1995), Swiss ice hockey player
Pericle Fazzini (1913–1987), Italian painter and sculptor
Jacopo Fazzini (born 2003), Italian footballer

See also
Azzini